This list of University of Florida Levin College of Law graduates includes notable recipients of one or more academic law degrees (LL.B., J.D., LL.M.) from the Levin College of Law, the law school of the University of Florida, located in Gainesville, Florida.  (For a list of notable alumni of the University of Florida's other academic divisions, see List of University of Florida alumni.)

Government

United States Senators

United States Representatives

Governors

Judiciary

United States Court of Appeals judges

United States District Court judges

Florida Supreme Court

Political figures

J. Dudley Goodlette (born 1948), politician and lawyer

Academic administrators

College and university presidents

American Bar Association

Attorneys

Miscellaneous

References

Levin College of Law alumni